The Pennsylvania Railroad's class I1s steam locomotives were the largest class of 2-10-0 "Decapods" in the United States. From 1916 to 1923, 598 locomotives were produced (123 at Altoona Works and 475 at Baldwin Locomotive Works). They were the dominant freight locomotive on the system until World War II and remained in service until 1957. Nicknames for the type included Decs and Hippos, the latter due to their large boiler.

The I1s design was much larger than the 2-10-0 design that preceded it, taking advantage of the PRR's heavy trackage and high allowed axle load, with a wide, free-steaming boiler. Large cylinders enabled the I1s to apply that power to the rails. However, the large boiler limited the size of the driving wheels, which made it impossible to mount counterweights large enough to balance the piston thrusts. As a result, they were hard riding at anything but low speeds, prone to slipping, and unpopular with crews. The locomotives were known for being very powerful, with one author describing them as "the holy terror of the PRR".

There was no obvious external difference, except for a revised builders' plate and combination lever. The I1s locomotives were converted to I1sa during major overhauls; eventually, 489 were converted while 109 remained as-built.

Preservation 
Of the 598 class I1 locomotives built for the Pennsylvania Railroad, only one (#4483) survived the scrapper's torch. PRR 4483 was built in May 1923 and assigned to drag freight service. In February 1931, it was converted to an I1sa, increasing its tractive effort, and assigned to the Eastern Region, Susquehanna Division and Northern Region. On 1 November 1944, PRR 4483 was reassigned to the Eastern Region, Central PA Division and Williamsport Division and equipped with a cab signal, whistle and acknowledger. In the early 1950s, it was again reassigned to the PRR Ebeenezer, often seen hauling coal drags up the Elmria Branch to the coal unloading docks in Sodus Bay on Lake Ontario, New York.

On 7 August 1957, 4483 was retired. In 1959, PRR 4483 was moved to the roundhouse in Northumberland, Pennsylvania. In 1963, the engine was purchased by the Westinghouse Air Brake Company to display on the front lawn of their headquarters in Wilmerding, Pennsylvania. The company had sought a railroad-themed display for its headquarters to commemorate its heritage of supplying air brakes to America's railroads. The locomotive saw little maintenance during this period and its condition deteriorated significantly, although the boiler's asbestos cladding was removed. By 1982, after the company grew tired of the locomotive on its front lawn, the Western New York Railway Historical Society acquired PRR 4483 and moved it to Hamburg, New York, where it now resides. Currently, the organization hopes to move the locomotive to the Heritage Discovery Center in Buffalo, New York to sit on public display.

Accidents and Incidents 

 On July 31, 1940, Two I1sa 2-10-0s were travelling with 73 freight cars was traveling from Columbus to Cleveland departed Arlington in Akron heading north when they collided with a Pennsylvania Railroad PRR class GEW275 Doodlebug No. 4648, Both I1sa 2-10-0s were repaired after the accident but would be scrapped when the Pennsylvania Railroad had dieselized.

Gallery

References

External links
 Photo Gallery and Further History of #4483
Audio of I1sa starting a heavy coal train, 1949
 Info and Photos on modeling an N Scale PRR I1s
 Diagram

Baldwin locomotives
2-10-0 locomotives
Steam locomotives of the United States
I1s
Railway locomotives introduced in 1916
Freight locomotives
Standard gauge locomotives of the United States